Kulappu Arachchige Don Dhammika Perera, commonly known as Dhammika Perera (born December 28, 1967), is a Sri Lankan businessman, philanthropist, and politician. He is one of the wealthiest people in Sri Lanka. Perera is known as a specialist in corporate re-engineering and revival. As of 2013 he controlled 23 listed companies, and has made significant investments in healthcare technology.  He is also known for frequently addressing policy for the country. 

In June 22, Perera was sworn in as a National list member of Parliament, after being proposed to the Election Commission by the Sri Lanka Podujana Peramuna, to fill the seat vacated by the resignation of former Finance Minister Basil Rajapaksa. On June 24, he was sworn in as the Minister of Investment Promotion. Days later on 10 July, he resigned from his ministerial position.

Biography 
Perera was born in 1967 in Payagala.

He began a business venture in 1986 at the age of 19 after completing his primary and secondary Education at Taxila Central College, Horana. He studied electronics at the University of Moratuwa, Katubedda, but dropped out to follow his business interests.

Career 
In 1987, Perera moved to Taiwan to follow his career in technical training for three months and returned to Sri Lanka to start his business making slot machines.

Perera started a machine manufacturing business in 1987 close to his residence in Payagala and continued the business until 1991. He then had to move to car sales in Paiyagala following a ban imposed on the jackpot and other machinery businesses by then-President Ranasinghe Premadasa.

He also ran Tito Electronics, an electronic shop repairing electronic circuit boards in Colpetty. He then started a casino business in 1993, which is now owned and managed by his two brothers. He started a business producing and selling neon bulbs in 1995, at a time when none of the manufacturers was keen on selling those bulbs. He met then International Monetary Fund resident representative in Sri Lanka Nadeem Ul Haque in 1998.

He acquired a majority stake in Pan Asia Bank in 2000, at a time when the bank was regarded as a loss-making financial institution. He met investor Nimal Perera after acquiring the Pan Asia Bank stake. In 2003, he ventured into large-scale businesses and took over the ownership of Royal Ceramics, at a time when the company was making losses.  He has been the executive director of Vallibel Finance since 2014.

In 2013, Perera became Sri Lanka's wealthiest individual, with a net worth estimated by Forbes Asia at 72.6 billion LKR (approx. 550 million US dollars).

He holds majority stakes in Vallibel Finance, Vallibel Power Erathna, The Fortress Resorts, The Queensbury Leisure Ltd and Delmege Limited. He is the current Co-Chairman of Hayleys, Royal Ceramics Lanka, Horana Plantations and LB Finance. He is a member of the board of directors of Amaya Leisure, Haycarb, Hayleys Fabric PLC, The Kingsbury, Dipped Products, and Lanka Floortiles.

Perera became the chairman of Lanka Tiles in 2017 and was appointed as the co-chairman of Singer (Sri Lanka) in October 2017 after Hayleys agreed to buy Singer. Perera was appointed as the chairman of Director Board of Lanka Ceramic PLC in 2017 but he resigned from the position on 31 August 2018. He was also appointed as chairman of Board of Directors of Lanka Walltiles in 2017.

In July 2019, Perera and his company Hayleys were accused by MP Kanaka Herath of earning income through the illegal import of garbage from the United Kingdom. Hayleys has since denied any wrongdoing in the matter and highlighted the fact that the Group's logistics arm was merely providing logistics services including storage, value addition and re-exportation for its client Ceylon Metal Processing Corporation for a resource recovery operation. Calling for a press conference on 22 July 2019, the managing director of Hayleys Advantis Limited, Ruwan Waidyaratne, categorically denied the allegations levelled against the company. In relation to 130 container loads of used mattresses that were stored at their Free Zone yard premises, the company clarified that the mattresses were imported by Ceylon Metal Processing Corporation (Pvt) Limited, the actual owner of the cargo.

As per the CSE filing, on 10 June 2022 Perera resigned from the boards of directors of Hayleys PLC, Singer (Sri Lanka) PLC, Hayleys Fabric PLC, Hayleys Leisure PLC, Haycarb PLC, and The Kingsbury PLC. Hayleys and subsidiaries separately announced his resignation from the Board of Directors. Companies which announced the move on 10 June 2022 included Hayleys PLC and its subsidiaries, Vallibel One PLC and its subsidiaries, Singer Sri Lanka PLC and its subsidiaries, Royal Ceramics Group, Lanka Walltiles Group and LB Finance PLC. In most of these entities, he was either the Chairman or Executive Director.

Philanthropic work
In October 2019, Perera and his wife Priscilla founded a private charity, Dhammika and Priscilla Perera Foundation (DP Foundation) with the aim of improving education and healthcare standards in Sri Lanka. The foundation is organized into two impact areas: education and healthcare.  

In 2021, during the COVID-19 pandemic in Sri Lanka, Perera introduced a philanthropic initiative titled DP Education for students to study online free of charge. He collaborated with the University of Moratuwa to offer a diploma to students aged 18 and above bundling mathematics, IT and English through the platform.

Publications

In September 2019, Perera published a document Sri Lanka 2030: A Developed Nation, with policy recommendations for 21 ministries with the aim of increasing Sri Lanka's per capita income to $12,000 by 2030. Following is the list of recommendations given for individual ministries:
 Ministry of National Security: A nation rich in safety and freedom
 Ministry of Finance and Planning: A nation rich in wealth
 Ministry of Education: A nation rich in human capital
 Ministry of Higher Education: A nation rich in human capital
 Ministry of Technical, Vocational Education and Training (TVET): A nation rich in human capital
 Ministry of Social Development: A nation rich in happiness
 Ministry of Regional Development: A nation rich in convenience
 Ministry of Justice and Prison Reforms: A nation rich in discipline
 Ministry of Agriculture and agro-based industry: A nation rich in prosperity
 Ministry of Environment and Natural Resources: A nation rich in biomes
 Ministry of Health: A nation rich in wellbeing
 Ministry of Investment Promotion and Job Creation: A nation rich in industries
 Ministry of Foreign Affairs: A nation rich in diplomacy
 Ministry of Information and Communication Technology: A nation rich in technology
 Ministry of Transport: A nation rich in mobility
 Ministry of Ports and Shipping: A nation rich in maritime logistics
 Ministry of Tourism: A nation rich in hospitality
 Ministry of Religious Affairs and Interfaith Harmony: A nation rich in unity
 Ministry of Arts and Culture: A nation rich in heritage
 Ministry of Fisheries: A nation rich in fish trade
 Ministry of Civil Aviation: A nation rich in connectivity

In May 2022, he outlined 12 strategies that aimed to generate an additional inflow of USD 8 billion per annum.

See also
 List of Sri Lankan non-career Permanent Secretaries

References

External links 
DP Education

1967 births
Living people
Sri Lankan businesspeople
Sri Lankan philanthropists
Alumni of the Institute of Technology, Moratuwa
People from Kalutara
Members of the 16th Parliament of Sri Lanka
Sri Lanka Podujana Peramuna politicians